Edward James Brogan (1834 – October 30, 1908) was a United States Army soldier who served in the American Indian Wars. He received the Medal of Honor for his service.

Brogan was born in County Donegal, Ireland, and later moved to Summit Hill, Pennsylvania. He joined the army in January 1864, and served with the 21st Pennsylvania Cavalry during the American Civil War. By the time of his Medal of Honor action, he was serving as a sergeant  in the 6th Cavalry Regiment.

Medal of Honor citation
 Rank and organization: Sergeant, Company G, 6th U.S. Cavalry.
 Place and date: At Simon Valley, Ariz., December 14, 1877.
 Entered service at: ------ Birth: Ireland.
 Date of issue: January 9, 1880.

 Engaged singlehanded 2 renegade Indians until his horse was shot under him and then pursued them so long as he was able.

References

External links
 

1834 births
1908 deaths
People from County Donegal
Irish emigrants to the United States (before 1923)
United States Army non-commissioned officers
American military personnel of the Indian Wars
United States Army Medal of Honor recipients
Irish-born Medal of Honor recipients
American Indian Wars recipients of the Medal of Honor